Dear Dolphin is a 2013 South Korean romance melodrama starring Lee Hee-joon, Lee Young-jin and Han Ye-ri, co-written and directed by Kang Jin-a in her directorial debut, it explores the themes of life, love, and grief. It premiered at the 14th Jeonju International Film Festival and won the CGV Movie Collage Prize.

Plot 
Cha-kyung (Han Ye-ri) and Hyuk-geun (Lee Hee-joon) are lovers. Gi-ok (Lee Young-jin), Cha-kyung's long-time close friend, has loved Hyuk-geun since they first met, but has kept her feelings hidden for the sake of her friendship with Cha-kyung. When Cha-kyung unexpectedly passes away in a car accident, the lives of both Hyuk-geun and Gi-ok change.

Even after a year, Hyuk-geun can't accept reality or move on, living in a fantasy in which Cha-kyung is still alive. On the other hand, Gi-ok acts as if the wound is healed and starts trying to act on her feelings toward Hyuk-geun.

Cast 

Lee Hee-joon as Kim Hyuk-geun
Lee Young-jin as Won Ki-ok    
Han Ye-ri as Sung Cha-kyung
Gi Ju-bong as therapist

References

External links 
 
 
 

2013 films
2010s Korean-language films
South Korean romantic drama films
2013 romantic drama films
2010s South Korean films